The plate scale of a telescope connects the angular separation of an object with the linear separation of its image at the focal plane

If focal length  is measured in mm, the plate scale in radians per mm is given by angular separation θ and the linear separation of the image at the focal plane s, or by simply the focal length f:

since

Plate scale is usually expressed in arc-seconds per mm:

where f is in mm,
or expressed in arc-seconds per pixel after further division through the pixel scale.

Plate scale on JWST FGS/NIRISS
The plate scale of the James Webb Space Telescope component Fine Guidance Sensor and Near Infrared Imager and Slitless Spectrograph is about 0.065 arcsec/pixel. It uses a 2048 x 2048 pixel array with a pixel size of 18 microns a side with a field of view of 2.2' x 2.2'

See also
Photographic plate

Notes

Astrophotography